Club Deportivo Santa Clara   is a Salvadoran professional football club based in Pasaquina, La Union.

The team was in the first division of El Salvador between 1997 and 2001.

Top Scorer
  Emiliano Pedrozo (12 goals in 1998/1999 Clausura)

Former coaches
El Salvador
 Rubén Guevara
 Carlos Mejía
 Saúl Molina
 Manuel Mejía

Winners of Man shot Chart Salvadoran Newspaper

 Emiliano Pedrozo (Clausura 1999) Goles Marcados 11

References

External links
 Potros se quedan cortos – El Diario de Hoy 

Defunct football clubs in El Salvador